The Fulgorinae are a sub-family of insects in the Auchenorrhyncha: which include the spectacular "lantern-bugs" and allied insects.

Tribes and genera 
Nine genera are currently listed by the NCBI, but molecular studies question the placement of genera in the Zannini, even questioning whether they belong to the family Fulgoridae.  The Hemiptera database suggests that there may be 15 genera in this subfamily in three tribes:

Fulgorini
Auth.: Latreille, 1807 (central and southern America)
 Aphrodisias Kirkaldy, 1906 
 Cathedra Kirkaldy, 1903  monotypic: Cathedra serrata
 Diareusa Walker, 1858 
 Fulgora Linné, 1767 (type genus)
 Odontoptera Carreno, 1841
 Phrictus Spinola, 1839

Laternariini
Auth.: Distant, 1906 (tropical Asia)
 Datua Schmidt, 1911
 Hariola Stål, 1863
 Pyrops Spinola, 1839 (incertae sedis by some authorities)
 Saiva Distant, 1906

incertae sedis
 Sinuala O'Brien, 1991 (central America)

See also

References

 
Hemiptera subfamilies